Pseudomuscari azureum (syn. Muscari azureum), the azure grape hyacinth, is a species of flowering plant in the family Asparagaceae, native to Turkey. A bulbous perennial, it is grown in gardens for its spring flowers. The Latin specific epithet azureum means "bright blue", a reference to its flower colour.

Description

Up to 60 flowers are borne in Spring (March or April in the Northern Hemisphere) in a dense "spike" (raceme). A feature which distinguishes the genus Pseudomuscari from the related Muscari is that the mouth of the flower is not narrowed but forms an open bell-shape. It grows in alpine meadows in north and east Turkey.

Cultivation

P. azureum may be found in horticultural sources under the illegitimate name Hyacinthus azureus. It is still widely referenced under its previous name Muscari azureum. The species is popular as a spring-flowering bulb; Brian Mathew describes it as "a delightful plant" for use in rock gardens or underneath shrubs. It is frost-hardy and should be grown in full sun. Under the name Muscari azureum it has gained the Royal Horticultural Society's Award of Garden Merit.  There is a white cultivar, 'Album'.

References

Flora of Turkey
Scilloideae